Bogampadu is a small village in Jammikunta mandal, Karimnagar district, India.

Villages in Karimnagar district